Derbyshire County Cricket Club in 1929 represents the cricket season when the English club Derbyshire had been playing for fifty eight years. It was their thirty-first season in the County Championship and they came seventh in the competition after winning ten matches in the championship.

1929 season

Derbyshire played 28 games in the County Championship, one match against Oxford University and one match against the touring South Africans. They won eleven matches altogether.

Guy Jackson was in his eighth year as captain. Harry Storer was top scorer with four centuries, two of them scored in the same match against Sussex. Storer and Joseph Bowden achieved a 1st wicket partnership of 322 against Essex, which remains a Derbyshire record. Tommy Mitchell took 104 wickets.

Thomas Armstrong made his debut in 1929 and went on to play many seasons for Derbyshire. Charles Clarke also made his debut and played for four seasons. Horace Wass a footballer played in just one match for Derbyshire during 1929.

Matches

Statistics

County Championship batting averages

County Championship bowling averages

Wicket-keeper

H Elliott Catches 47 Stumping 17

See also
Derbyshire County Cricket Club seasons
1929 English cricket season

References

1929 in English cricket
Derbyshire County Cricket Club seasons
English cricket seasons in the 20th century